Boelckea is a genus of flowering plants belonging to the family Plantaginaceae.

Its native range is Bolivia.

Species:

Boelckea beckii

References

Plantaginaceae
Plantaginaceae genera